Salvia trachyphylla is a species of flowering plant in the family Lamiaceae that is native to Ecuador. Its natural habitats are subtropical or tropical moist montane forests and subtropical or tropical high-altitude shrubland.

References

trachyphylla
Flora of Ecuador
Vulnerable plants
Taxonomy articles created by Polbot